Somewhere in the Night may refer to:

 Somewhere in the Night (film), a 1946 film noir by Joseph L. Mankiewicz
 Somewhere in the Night (album), a 1987 album by Sawyer Brown
 "Somewhere in the Night" (Helen Reddy song), 1975; also recorded by Batdorf & Rodney and others; covered by Barry Manilow (1978)
 "Somewhere in the Night" (The Oak Ridge Boys song), 1981; covered by Sawyer Brown, 1987